Puzzle Animation Studio Limited is a Shenzhen-based animation studio, established in 2005. The studio engaged in the creation and production of 2D and 3D animated films and TV series featuring Chinese themes and characteristics.

Filmography
Master Q: Incredible Pet Detective (2003)
Old Master Q – Fantasy Zone Battle (2005)
Old Master Q – Fantasy Zone Battle II (2006)
Old Master Series 3 (2006)
Master Q Color Comics (2006)
Gu Yu Xin Shuo (2006)
Hong Kong Mother (2006)
The Diary of Xiao Dong Zi (2007)
Paula & Friends (2007)
Sparkling Red Star (2007)
Storm Rider Clash of the Evils (2008)
Ji Ling Xiao Zhi Zhe / Zen Shuo (200?)
AI Football GGO (2010)
Ori-Princess (2011)
World Peacekeepers (2014)

See also
History of Chinese Animation
Chinese Animation

External links
 Official Website

References

Chinese animation studios
Chinese film studios
Entertainment companies established in 2005
2005 establishments in China
Film production companies of China